Valerijonas Balčiūnas (27 November 1904 – 18 December 1984) was a Lithuanian footballer who competed in the 1924 Summer Olympics.

Balčiūnas was a goalkeeper for ŠŠ Kovas Kaunas when he got called up to represent Lithuania at the 1924 Summer Olympics in Paris, France, unfortunately they lost in the first round against Switzerland 0-9, a couple of days later a friendly match was arranged against Egypt and this time Balčiūnas conceded 10 goals. Over the next two years Balčiūnas played three more internationals including Lithuania's first ever international victory which was against Estonia.

Balčiūnas would later become an international referee, and officiated in five internationals all involving Latvia.

References

1904 births
1984 deaths
Footballers from Minsk
People from Minsky Uyezd
Lithuanian footballers
Lithuania international footballers
Footballers at the 1924 Summer Olympics
Olympic footballers of Lithuania
Association football goalkeepers